Netaji Subhas Open University (NSOU) is a state open university imparting distance education in eastern India

History
It was established in 1997 to commemorate the birth centenary of Netaji Subhas Chandra Bose. It has its headquarters at 1, Woodburn Park, Kolkata - 700020, It was the residence of Sarat Bose from late 1928. Netaji lived mainly at 38/2 Elgin Road & at Woodburn Park between 1928 - 1931. Its medium of instruction are English and Bengali. Modeled on the Open University, UK and the IGNOU, it offers courses in different disciplines of taught graduate and post-graduate  study and is one of the largest growing education universities in eastern India. The logo was designed by eminent painter Professor Mrinal Kanti Ray.

Administration
Chancellor:  C. V. Ananda Bose, Governor of West Bengal.
Vice-Chancellor: Professor Ranjan Chakrabarti
Registrar : Sri Kishore Sengupta 
Director, Study Centres : Dr. Ashit Baran Aich
Finance Officer : Sri Sachindra Chandra Kar
Controller of Examinations: Mrs Rokeya Ray

School
 School of Science.
 School of Humanities.
 School of Social Sciences.
 School of Professional Studies.
 School of Education.
 School of Vocational Studies.

Campus

The university functions from the following campuses:
 Netaji Subhas Open University, DD-26, Sector I, Salt Lake, Kolkata 700064 (Headquarters of all administrative works)
 Netaji Subhas Open University, 1st Floor, K2, Bidhan Nagar Fire Station, Sector-5, Salt Lake, Kolkata 700091 (School of Sciences, Publications, Online and Video-Conferencing Units)
 Netaji Subhas Open University, 25/2, Ballygunge Circular Road, Kolkata 700019 (School of Education)
 Netaji Subhas Open University, 2nd Floor, 134/1, Meghnad Saha Sarani, Kolkata 700029 (School of Professional and Technological Studies, Office of the Controller of Examinations and Centre for Language Studies)
 Regional Centre, Netaji Subhas Open University, Kalyani Ghoshpara, Kalyani—741235 (University's first eco-friendly green campus)
Regional Centre, Netaji Subhas Open University, Jawahar Lal Nehru Road, Durgapur, Pachim Bardhaman - 713 214.(adjacent to Durgapur Govt. Degree College)
Regional Centre, Netaji Subhas Open University,  Patkata, Kotwali, Jalpaiguri - 735 102.(Inside the premises of Govt. Engineering College, Jalpaiguri)
 Netaji Subhas Open University, 24/8, Garcha 1st Lane, Kolkata 700019 (Transmission Centre of FM Channel Gyan Vani).
 Ben Fish Bhavan, Salt Lake (another Print and Publication Section).

At present, the university is continuing its work with 150 Study Centres. In near future more study centres will be opened.

Teaching methods
To provide individualised support to its students, NSOU has large number of Study Centres throughout West Bengal.

NSOU uses a variety of methods for distance learning:

1. Self Instructional Material: Self instructional study materials are distributed to the students through the Study Centres.

2. Audio-Video CD: Audio and video cassettes of a specific programme are supplied to the Study Centres. The audiotapes are run and video cassettes are screened at the Study Centres.

3. Personal Contact Programme: Instruction are imparted through self-instructional study materials and Personal Contact Programme. The Personal Contact Programme is generally held on Saturdays and Sundays.

4. Gyan Vani FM Channel: NSOU started the Gyan Vani FM, Kolkata, a radio channel on 105.4 MHz.

5. Interactive Radio Counselling: The University broadcasts different subjects on 4th Sunday of every month through All India Radio (AIR) at Kolkata B. Apart from the regular classes various topics on Awareness Programme; Support Services Special Programme of National importances are also broadcast.

Awards
In 2006, Netaji Subhas Open University received Excellence in Distance Education Award (EDEA) from Commonwealth of Learning (COL) for institutional excellence.

See also
 List of universities in India

References

External links
 Official website of Netaji Subhas Open University
 Open Repository, Memory of Bengal Partition, An initiative of Netaji Subhas Open University

Universities in Kolkata
Open universities in India
Memorials to Subhas Chandra Bose
Educational institutions established in 1997
1997 establishments in West Bengal